Ruzhany (former / alternative spellings include Różana and Ruzhinoy)  is a small town located in Pruzhany Raion of Brest Region, Belarus.

Geography

Ruzhany is situated on the river Ruzhanka and surrounded by picturesque hills. It is 140 km away from Brest, 38 km from Ivatsevichy (where the nearest railway station is located), 45 km north-east from Pruzhany, on the crossing of the roads from Pruzhany to Slonim and from Vaukavysk to Kosava.

History
The earliest mentioning of Ruzhany dates back to 1552. Following the First World War the town was part of Poland until September 1939, when it was occupied by the Soviet Union and incorporated into the Byelorussian SSR. From 23 June 1941 until 13 July 1944, Ruzhany was occupied by Nazi Germany and administered as a part of Bezirk Bialystok. Almost the entire pre-war population of 3,500 Jews were killed in the Holocaust, mostly at Treblinka extermination camp.

On Sept. 19, 1659, R.Yisrael ben Shalom and R.Tuvyah Bachrach were killed in Ruzhany on Rosh HaShana 5420, in the infamous blood libel.

Notable residents

Some notable past residents of Ruzhany include:
 The Sapieha family, influential Polish-Lithuanian aristocrats, who built a palace at Ruzhany (see below).
 I. M. Pines, a famous writer and Zionist.
 Yitzhak Shamir, former Prime Minister of Israel.
 Melech Epstein, a US Yiddish language journalist.
 Louis Leon Ribak, a US artist.

Notable sights

Interesting sights in Ruzhany include:
 Ruzhany Palace: a large and impressive, but mostly ruined complex. Now undergoing complete renovation.
 Two large churches: Trinity Church (Catholic, dating from 1617 ) and St Peter & Paul (Orthodox, built 1762-88 )
 A small chapel named for St. Casimir is in the town cemetery
 An ancient Jewish graveyard  and a large ruined synagogue 
 A small German cemetery

References

External links
 "All About Ruzhany" (Unofficial Ruzhany Site)
 Ruzhany at Radzima.org
 Webpage about Ruzhany's history and present (in Russian)
 Jewish Electronic Encyclopedia page on Ruzhany (in Russian)
 Ruzhany on KehilaLinks
 

Populated places in Brest Region
Urban-type settlements in Belarus
Nowogródek Voivodeship (1507–1795)
Slonimsky Uyezd
Polesie Voivodeship
Holocaust locations in Belarus
Pruzhany District